Hamilton Verschoyle (3 April 1803 – 29 January 1870) was a 19th-century Irish Anglican bishop who served as Bishop of Kilmore, Elphin and Ardagh from 1862 to his death.

The Verschoyles were of Dutch Huguenot origin who fled to Ireland in 1568 to escape religious persecution and quickly became prominent in Dublin.

Hamilton Verschoyle was the third son of John Verschoyle of Cashelshanaghan, County Donegal, and Henrietta Preston. He was educated at Oswestry School and Trinity College, Dublin and ordained in 1829. His first post was that of Curate at Newtownforbes after which he was the incumbent at the Episcopal Chapel, Upper Baggot Street in Dublin. Promoted to be the Chancellor of Dublin Cathedral in 1855, he also served on its Diocesan Education Board and was briefly Dean of Ferns before his appointment to the episcopate as the third Bishop of Kilmore. He was dubbed a "judicious, but by no means a brilliant preacher" in 1867. 

His grave is at the Parish Church in Paignton, Devon, England where he is noted as dying in Torquay, on 28 Jan 1870, as the 42nd Bishop of Kilmore. 

He married Catherine Margaret Hawkins, daughter and co-heiress of Rev. Thomas Hawkins of Ballybodonnell. Their son, Rev. Hamilton Stuart Verschoyle, received the Cross of the Crown of Italy in 1888 for public services. He married Frances Frederica Goold, the daughter and eventual co-heiress of the Venerable Frederick  Goold, Archdeacon of Raphoe and brother of Wyndham Goold, MP for Limerick, (1850–54). The Ven. Archdeacon Goold had been disinherited by his father, Master of the Court of Chancery Thomas Goold, for marrying Catherine Newcomen (whose illegitimate sister was Theresa, Countess of Eglinton and Winton), but inherited the family estate following the death of his brother. Hamilton Stuart's son, Hamilton Frederick Stuart Verschoyle, assumed the arms and name of his grandfather, changing the name to Goold-Verschoyle in 1900.

Arms

References

1803 births
1870 deaths
20th-century Anglican bishops in Ireland
Alumni of Trinity College Dublin
Bishops of Kilmore, Elphin and Ardagh
Deans of Ferns
People educated at Oswestry School
Irish people of Dutch descent